In the run-up to the next Serbian parliamentary election, various organisations carry out opinion polling to gauge voting intentions in Serbia. The results of such polls are displayed in this list. The date range for these opinion polls is from the previous election, held on 3 April 2022, to the present day.

Graphical summary

Poll results

2023

2022

Notes

References 

Next
Serbia